is a 2004 Japanese comedy drama fantasy film written and directed by Katsuhito Ishii. Described as a "surreal" version of Ingmar Bergman's Fanny and Alexander (1982), it follows the daily lives of a family living in rural Tochigi prefecture, north of Tokyo. It was a selection of the Cannes Film Festival.

Synopsis
The film follows the lives of the Haruno family, who live in rural Tochigi Prefecture, the countryside north of Tokyo. Nobuo is a hypnotherapist. He teaches Go to his son Hajime. Hajime becomes an excellent Go player, but he has a rough time with girls and puberty. Yoshiko refuses to be an average housewife and works on animated film projects at home. She uses assistance from grandfather Akira, an eccentric old man who is a former animator and occasional model.

Eight-year-old Sachiko periodically sees a silent, giant-size double of herself which mimics or benignly watches her. She contemplates ways to rid herself of it. Uncle Ayano is a sound engineer and record producer who comes to stay for a visit. He engages in inward reflection, seeks closure regarding an old relationship, and recounts a childhood experience—a tale that influences Sachiko and ties into later events.

Cast
Tomokazu Miura - Nobuo Haruno - father
Satomi Tezuka - Yoshiko Haruno - mother
Maya Banno - Sachiko Haruno - daughter
Takahiro Sato - Hajime Haruno - son
Tadanobu Asano - Ayano Haruno - uncle
Tatsuya Gashuin - Akira Todoroki - grandpa
Tomoko Nakajima - Akira Terako
Ikki Todoroki - Himself
Anna Tsuchiya - Aoi Suzuishi
Kenichi Matsuyama - Matsuken/The man in the red shirt
Hideaki Anno - Kasugabe
Rinko Kikuchi - Yuriko Kikuchi
Ryo Kase - Rokutaro Hamadayama
Kenji Mizuhashi - Maki Hoshino

Reception
The Taste of Tea has a 100% approval rating on Rotten Tomatoes and a 77/100 weighted average on Metacritic. It was also one of Ed Park's choices in the 2012 Sight & Sound critics' poll of the greatest films ever made.

Awards
Audience Award - 2004, Entrevues Film Festival
Grand Prix - 2004, Entrevues Film Festival
Golden Maile Award (Best Feature Film) - 2004, Hawaii International Film Festival
Best New Actress (Anna Tsuchiya) - 2004, Hochi Film Awards
Orient Express Award - 2004, Festival de Cine de Sitges (Special Mention)
Audience Award - 2005, Dejima Japanese Film Festival
Best Asian Film - 2005, Fant-Asia Film Festival
Fantasia Ground-Breaker Award - 2005, Fant-Asia Film Festival (3rd Place)
Audience Award - 2005, New York Asian Film Festival
Best New Actress (Anna Tsuchiya) - 2005 Kinema Junpo Awards
New Talent Award (Anna Tsuchiya) - 2005, Mainichi Film Award
Festival Prize - 2005, Yokohama Film Festival

References

Sources

External links
 
 

2004 films
2000s Japanese-language films
Films directed by Katsuhito Ishii
New People films
Hypnotherapy
2000s Japanese films
Films produced by Kazutoshi Wadakura